Jacques Crétaine (16 June 1917 – 5 July 2003) was a French athlete. He competed in the men's decathlon at the 1948 Summer Olympics.

References

1917 births
2003 deaths
Athletes (track and field) at the 1948 Summer Olympics
French decathletes
Olympic athletes of France
Place of birth missing